Phetchaburi or Phet Buri is one of the western or central provinces (changwat) of Thailand. Neighboring provinces are (from north clockwise) Ratchaburi, Samut Songkhram, and Prachuap Khiri Khan. In the west it borders the Tanintharyi Division of Myanmar. Phetchaburi is home to Kaeng Krachan National Park.

Geography
Phetchaburi is at the north end of the Malay Peninsula, with the Gulf of Thailand to the east and the Tanaosi mountain range forming the boundary to Myanmar. Except for these border mountains most of the province is a flat plain. With an area of  Kaeng Krachan National Park is Thailand's largest national park, covering nearly half of the province. It protects mostly rain forests in the mountains along the boundary to Myanmar, but also the Kaeng Krachan Reservoir is part of the park. The only significant river of the province is the Phetchaburi River.

History

Originally, Phetchaburi was known as "Pipeli" (พลิพลี), or "Pribpri" (พริบพรี) as it used to be one of the southern kingdoms in Thai history alike to Tambralinga. Its name was recorded in De la Louère's memo during the reign of King Narai in the middle of the Ayutthaya period.

In 1860 King Rama IV built a palace near the city of Phetchaburi, commonly known as Khao Wang, but its official name is Phra Nakhon Khiri. Next to the palace the king built a tower for his astronomical observations. On the adjoining hill is the royal temple Wat Phra Kaeo.

Symbols
The provincial seal shows the Khao Wang palace in the background. In front are rice fields bordered by two coconut palm trees, symbolizing the major crops in the province.

The provincial tree is  Eugenia cumini. Thai mahseer (Tor tambroides) is a provincial fish that is delicious and used to be found in the Phetchaburi River.

Environment
Phetchaburi's shoreline on the Inner Gulf of Thailand in the area of Pak Thale consists of salt pans, mudflats, mangroves, and sand spits. It has been termed, "...the premier bird watching site for shorebirds in Thailand,..." The 123-acre site provides sustenance for both passage and wintering species, as well as residents. The area hosts more than 7,000 waterbirds during the northern hemisphere winter. Economic development of the tidal flats, compounded by the impacts of climate change, threaten this ecosystem's future. Several regular visitors are under threat, including the critically endangered Spoon-billed sandpiper and Great knot, Nordmann's greenshank, and Far Eastern curlew.

Administrative divisions

Provincial government
The province is divided into eight districts (amphoe), which are further divided into 93 subdistricts (tambons) and 681 villages (mubans).

Local government
As of 26 November 2019 there are: one Phetchaburi Provincial Administration Organisation and 15 municipal (thesaban) areas in the province. Phetchaburi and Cha-am have town (thesaban mueang) status. Further 13 subdistrict municipalities (thesaban tambon). The non-municipal areas are administered by 69 Subdistrict Administrative Organisations – SAO (ongkan borihan suan tambon).

Economy
Phetchaburi province is an important salt producer. In 2011, 9,880 rai worked by 137 families were devoted to salt production in Phetchaburi.

The province is known for its palm sugar. It has more sugar palm trees than any other province. Producing sugar is a specialty of Ban Lat District in particular.  It is a vital ingredient for the production of many Thai desserts such as Khanom mo kaeng etc. And that gave Phetchaburi the nickname "city of desserts".

Tourism plays a significant role in the economy of Phetchaburi province. The province, however, has dropped from the fourth to the sixth most popular destination in Thailand due to coastal erosion, much of it in Cha-am District, caused by rising sea levels leading to "deteriorating scenery".

Human achievement index 2017

Since 2003, United Nations Development Programme (UNDP) in Thailand has tracked progress on human development at sub-national level using the Human achievement index (HAI), a composite index covering all the eight key areas of human development. National Economic and Social Development Board (NESDB) has taken over this task since 2017.

Transportation 

An excursion train Bangkok-Suan Son Pradiphat service only on Saturdays, Sundays and public holidays, stop at this station including Cha-am Railway Station.

Health 
Phetchaburi's main hospital is Phrachomklao Hospital, operated by the Ministry of Public Health.

Arts and Crafts
With a long history causing Phetchaburi to have their own style of arts and crafts. Until now, it is known as "Phet School".  Examples of handicrafts here include banana stalk carving, Phetchaburi is well known for its banana stalk carving craft. Traditionally, they were used to decorate crematoriums during funerals, and Thai lacquer works etc.

Tourism
Hat Cha-am (หาดชะอำ) Appearing to have been frozen in time warp, midway between remaining a Thai-style resort, and modernising to meet international tastes and requirements, this extensive pine-fringed beach is considered to be one of the most popular beaches of Thailand.

Maruekhathaiyawan Palace (พระราชนิเวศน์มฤคทายวัน) This beachside wooden palace was formerly used as a royal summer residence by King Rama VI during the 1920s.  Facing the open sea, the palace is referred to as the palace of love and hope.

Phra Nakhon Khiri Historical Park (อุทยานประวัติศาสตร์พระนครคีรี) This covers a hilly area with an old palace and historical temples in the vicinity of the town.  It consists of royal halls, temples and groups of buildings, constructed mostly in harmonious Thai, Western neoclassic and Chinese architectural styles.

Wat Kamphaeng Laeng (วัดกำแพงแลง) This temple was originally a Khmer place of worship.  It was later turned into a Buddhist temple and a shrine hall was constructed.  However, the outlook of the place has not much changed due to the existence of sandstone walls and four Khmer style pagodas.

Hat Chao Samran (หาดเจ้าสำราญ) Legend says that King Naresuan the Great and King Eka Thotsarot made several royal visits here and highly appreciated its beauty.  The villagers thus rendered it a name "Hat Chao Samran", which means "beach of royal leisure".

Hat Chomphon (หาดจอมพล)  Another beach that is quiet therefore is especially suitable for those who like peace, located next to the southern part of Hat Chao Samran. It has a restaurant and a hotel. This beach is under the maintain of the Royal Thai Army (RTA), similar to Hat Suan Son Pradiphat of neighboring province Prachuap Khiri Khan. Its name meaning "field marshal's beach".

Chang Hua Man Royal Project (โครงการชั่งหัวมัน ตามพระราชดำริ) Royal agricultural project of the late King Rama IX, offering organic farm tours & a restaurant. Initiated in 2009 on 250 rai (99 acres) of land, the Chang Hua Man Royal Project is an experimental farm where a range of experimental crops are being tested, not only to help the local people of the Phetchaburi area, but farmers throughout the country. Located in the area of Ban Nong Kho Kai, Khao Puk Sub-district, Tha Yang District.

Laem Phak Bia and Pak Thale (แหลมผักเบี้ยและปากทะเล)  Large area of salt pans, mudflats, mangrove remnants and sand spit in Phetchaburi. This is without doubt the premier birdwatching site for shorebirds in Thailand, with large numbers of birds and many rare species appearing annually.

Whale Watching (ดูวาฬ) Duration from October to February coincides with the period of water compression (according to vernacular, "water compression" will take place during the time that tide in the Gulf of Thailand will spin out of Samut Songkhram and Phetchaburi provinces. Animals that are feed for whales would come out along). With any luck, it is possible to watch Bryde's whales come out to find feed on the coast of the Gulf of Thailand. Going on a cruise for watching these whales with mouths fully open above the water surface to stalk prey (anchovies and krill) is an impressive experience. There are cruise service both at Hat Chao Samran and Laem Phak Bia piers.

Kaeng Krachan National Park (อุทยานแห่งชาติแก่งกระจาน) The largest national park in Thailand overlapping with Prachuap Khiri Khan province, was established in 1981. Just like other national parks, this place is full of wildlife. Kaeng Krachan National Park considered to be the place where wild elephants can be seen and most easily in the country.

Food
Phetchaburi has many eminent dishes such as
Khanom mo kaeng: a Thai coconut and egg custard. It is considered the most prominent and renowned souvenir in the province.
Khao chae: traditional Thai food that is hard to find in modern times, but easily found in Phetchaburi. It is a food that is influenced by Mon cuisine. Its name literally meaning "soaked rice".
Kaeng lok: authentic curry of Phetchaburi province. It is a rare food that many people do not know, and even in the province itself, today there are only a few restaurants that are still cooked and sold. Its name can be translated directly as "false curry", since it is cooked using curry paste that does not use chili like other curries.
Kuay teaw nam daeng: braised pork noodles in a special broth that is sweet and has a red color.

Gallery

References

External links

Website of province (Thai only)

 
Provinces of Thailand
Gulf of Thailand